Shashkevych Oak is a botanical natural monument of local significance in Ukraine, located in the village of Shmankivtsi, Chortkiv Raion, Ternopil Oblast, near the Orthodox Church.

Sources 
Огородник, М. Дуб Маркіяна Шашкевича росте у Шманьківцях / Максим Огородник // Чортківський Вісник. — 2018. — № 10 (23 березня). — С. 4. — (З історії святинь).
Реєстр природно-заповідного фонду Чортківського району // Управління екології та природних ресурсів Тернопільської ОДА.

Shmankivtsi
Individual oak trees
Individual trees in Ukraine